Benjamin Ricketson Tucker (April 17, 1854 – June 22, 1939) was an American individualist anarchist and libertarian socialist. Tucker was the editor and publisher of the American individualist anarchist periodical Liberty (1881–1908). Tucker was a member of the First International, while describing his form of anarchism as "consistent Manchesterism" and stated that "the Anarchists are simply unterrified Jeffersonian Democrats."

Tucker harshly opposed state socialism and was a supporter of free-market socialism and libertarian socialism which he termed anarchist or anarchistic socialism as well as a follower of mutualism. He connected the classical economics of Adam Smith and the Ricardian socialists as well as that of Josiah Warren, Karl Marx and Pierre-Joseph Proudhon to socialism. Later in his life, Tucker converted to Max Stirner's egoism. Some modern commentators have described Tucker as an anarcho-capitalist, although this has been disputed by others, as well as by some anarcho-capitalists who state the differences between their ideology and individualist anarchism. During his lifetime, Tucker considered himself a socialist due to his belief in the labor theory of value and disputed many of the dictionary definitions of the term which he believed were inaccurate.

Biography

Early life and Liberty 

Born on April 17, 1854 in South Dartmouth, Massachusetts to a Quaker family, Tucker made his editorial debut in anarchist circles in 1876, when Ezra Heywood published Tucker's English translation of Pierre-Joseph Proudhon's classic work What is Property? In 1877, he published his first original journal Radical Review, but it ran for only four issues. From August 1881 to April 1908, Tucker published the periodical Liberty, "widely considered to be the finest individualist-anarchist periodical ever issued in the English language".

The periodical was instrumental in developing and formalizing the individualist anarchist philosophy through publishing essays and serving as a format for debate. Beside Tucker, contributors also included Lysander Spooner, Gertrude Kelly, Auberon Herbert, Dyer Lum, Joshua K. Ingalls, John Henry Mackay, Victor Yarros, Wordsworth Donisthorpe, James L. Walker, J. William Lloyd, Florence Finch Kelly, Voltairine de Cleyre, Steven T. Byington, John Beverley Robinson, Jo Labadie, Lillian Harman and Henry Appleton. Included in its masthead is a quote from Proudhon saying that liberty is "Not the Daughter But the Mother of Order". Tucker's first associations were with the anarcho-communists, with whom he shared and supported the objective of "socialism without the state". Tucker contributed to anarcho-communist publications already at the age of twenty.

Later life and death 
After moving Liberty from Boston to New York in 1892, Tucker opened his Unique Book Shop in New York in 1906, promoting "Egoism in Philosophy, Anarchism in Politics, Iconoclasm in Art". In 1908, a fire destroyed Tucker's uninsured printing equipment and his thirty-year stock of books and pamphlets. Tucker's lover Pearl Johnson, twenty-five years his junior, was pregnant with their daughter Oriole Tucker. Six weeks after his daughter's birth, Tucker closed both Liberty and the book shop and retired with his family to France. In 1913, he came out of retirement for two years to contribute articles and letters to The New Freewoman which he called "the most important publication in existence".

Later, Tucker became much more pessimistic about the prospects for anarchism. In 1926, Vanguard Press published a selection of his writings entitled Individual Liberty in which Tucker added a postscript to "State Socialism and Anarchism" which stated the following: "Forty years ago, when the foregoing essay was written, the denial of competition had not yet effected the enormous concentration of wealth that now so gravely threatens social order. It was not yet too late to stem the current of accumulation by a reversal of the policy of monopoly. The Anarchistic remedy was still applicable". Furthermore, Tucker argued:

By 1930, Tucker had concluded that centralization and advancing technology had doomed both anarchy and civilization:

According to historian James J. Martin, Tucker wrote the following in a private correspondence when referring to the world scene of the mid-1930s: "Capitalism is at least tolerable, which cannot be said of Socialism or Communism". Martin also states how Tucker went on to observe that "under any of these regimes a sufficiently shrewd man can feather his nest". Susan Love Brown claims that this unpublished private letter served in "providing the shift further illuminated in the 1970s by anarcho-capitalists". However, the editors of the 1970 edition of Martin's book Men Against the State state on the back cover that while believing a "new generation has prompted the reissuance of this book", they pointed to renewed interest in the views of Tucker and the other individualist anarchists and their free-market socialism rather than capitalism or anarcho-capitalism. In 1939, Tucker died in the company of his family in Monaco which his daughter Oriole reported as such:
Father's attitude towards communism never changed one whit, nor about religion. [...] In his last months he called in the French housekeeper. 'I want her,' he said, 'to be a witness that on my death bed I'm not recanting. I do not believe in God!

Towards the end of Tucker's life, anarchist Victor Yarros described him as a "forceful and clear writer, but a poor speaker" and said that "to write for capitalistic or bourgeois newspapers was, in his eyes, the worst form of prostitution.

Political views

Anarchism 

Tucker said that he became an anarchist at the age of eighteen. Tucker's contribution to individualist anarchism was as much through his publishing as his own writing. Tucker was also the first to publish an English translation of Max Stirner's The Ego and Its Own, which Tucker claimed was his proudest accomplishment. Tucker also translated Mikhail Bakunin's book God and the State. In the anarchist periodical Liberty, he published the original work of Stephen Pearl Andrews, Joshua K. Ingalls, Lysander Spooner, Auberon Herbert, Dyer Lum, Victor Yarros and Lillian Harman (daughter of free love anarchist Moses Harman) as well as his own writing. After the French libertarian communist Joseph Déjacque, According to Anthony Comegna of the Cato Institute, Tucker was the first American born to use libertarian.

According to Frank Brooks, an historian of American individualist anarchism, it is easy to misunderstand Tucker's claim to socialism. Before Marxists established a hegemony over definitions of socialism, "the term socialism was a broad concept". Tucker as well as most of the writers and readers of Liberty understood socialism to refer to one or more of various theories aimed at solving the labor problem through radical changes in the capitalist economy. Descriptions of the problem, explanations of its causes and proposed solutions (abolition of private property and support of cooperatives or public ownership) varied among socialist philosophies.

Not all modern economists believe Marxists established a hegemony over definitions of socialism. According to modern economist Jim Stanford, "markets are not unique to capitalism" and "there is nothing inherently capitalist about a market", further arguing:
But capitalism is not the only economic system which relies on markets. Pre-capitalist economies also had markets — where producers could sell excess supplies of agricultural goods or handicrafts, and where exotic commodities (like spices or fabrics) from far-off lands could be purchased. Most forms of socialism also rely heavily on markets to distribute end products and even, in some cases, to organize investment and production. So markets are not unique to capitalism, and there is nothing inherently capitalist about a market.

Although he strongly disagreed with the theory, Karl Marx acknowledged market socialism, especially the mutualism of Pierre-Joseph Proudhon, who happened to be an influence on Tucker's individualist anarchism. According to James J. Martin, a historian on individualist anarchism, the individualist anarchists (including the views of Tucker and his support for the labor theory of value) made the individualist anarchists and their form of American mutualism an alternative to both capitalism and Marxism. Tucker said socialism was the claim that "labor should be put in possession of its own" while holding that what he respectively termed state socialism and anarchistic socialism had in common was the labor theory of value.

Instead of asserting that common ownership was the key to eroding differences of economic power and appealing to social solidarity, as did many social anarchists, Tucker's individualist anarchism advocated distribution of property in an undistorted natural free market as a mediator of egoistic impulses and a source of social stability rooted in a free-market socialist system:

Tucker first favored a natural rights philosophy in which an individual had a right to own the fruits of his labor, but then abandoned it in favor of egoist anarchism (influenced by Max Stirner) in which he believed that only the right of might exists until overridden by contract. According to Charles A. Madison, Tucker was a "champion of complete individual liberty" and thus "disliked all types of communism", believing that even a stateless communist society must encroach upon the liberty of individuals, insisting instead on the voluntary nature of all association and rejecting majority rule, organized religion and the institution of marriage due to their compulsory nature. It was the compulsory nature of communism that Tucker opposed, writing: "Whoever denies private property is of necessity an Archist. This excludes from Anarchism all believers in compulsory Communism. As for the believers in voluntary Communism (of whom there are precious few), they are of necessity believers in the liberty to hold private property, for to pool one's possessions with those of others is nothing more or less than an exercise of proprietorship".

According to Sheldon Richman, writing in The American Conservative, Tucker "denounced Marx as the representative of 'the principle of authority which we live to combat' and thought Proudhon 'the superior theorist and the real champion of freedom' as 'Marx would nationalize the productive and distributive forces; Proudhon would individualize and associate them'". In Individual Liberty, Tucker connected his libertarian socialist economic views which included his opposition to non-labor income in the form of profit, interest and rent with those of Adam Smith, Josiah Warren, Proudhon and Marx in the following way while arguing against American anti-socialists who declared socialism as imported:

Anarchist society 
Tucker disapproved of government ownership because to him state control was the most complete and most obnoxious form of monopoly, stating: "The government is a tyrant living by theft, and therefore has no business to engage in any business. [...] The government has none of the characteristics of a successful business man, being wasteful, careless, clumsy, and short-sighted in the extreme". Tucker maintained that all forms of authoritarian activities imply the resort to force and nothing good or lasting was ever accomplished by compulsion. Thus, he refused to condone the overthrow of the state by violent means, arguing: "If government should be abruptly and entirely abolished tomorrow, there would probably ensue a series of physical conflicts about land and many other things, ending in reaction and a revival of the old tyranny". Hence, Tucker preached widespread education and ultimately a passive resistance that was to take forms such as refusal to pay taxes, the evasion of jury duty and military service and the non-observance of compulsion. Once society reached this state, individual liberty for all would prevail as a matter of course.

Tucker envisioned an individualist anarchist society as "each man reaping the fruits of his labour and no man able to live in idleness on an income from capital, [...] become[ing] a great hive of Anarchistic workers, prosperous and free individuals [combining] to carry on their production and distribution on the cost principle" rather than a bureaucratic organization of workers organized into rank and file unions. However, he did hold a genuine appreciation for labor unions (which he called trades-union socialism) and saw it as "an intelligent and self-governing socialism", saying: "[They] promise the coming substitution of industrial socialism for usurping legislative mobism". In Tucker's individualist anarchism, governments would exist consisting of any belief and in any shape, or form, but the governments would be supported by voluntary taxation and those who chose not to pay the taxes would not get the benefits or protection of the voluntary government. Economically, this anarchist society would be a socialist free-market system where employers would pay their employees the full value of their labor due to the abolition of legally-protected money and land monopolies.

Fellow individualist anarchist and American historian James J. Martin states:

According to Peter Marshall, "the egalitarian implications of traditional individualist anarchists" such as Tucker and Lysander Spooner have been overlooked.

Attitude towards unions 
Tucker rejected the legislative programs of labor unions, laws imposing a short day, minimum wage laws, forcing businesses to provide insurance to employees and compulsory pension systems. He believed instead that strikes should be organized by free workers rather than by bureaucratic union officials and organizations. He argued that "strikes, whenever and wherever inaugurated, deserve encouragement from all the friends of labour. [...] They show that people are beginning to know their rights, and knowing, dare to maintain them". Furthermore, "as an awakening agent, as an agitating force, the beneficent influence of a strike is immeasurable. [...] [W]ith our present economic system almost every strike is just. For what is justice in production and distribution? That labour, which creates all, shall have all".

Despite his initial reactions, Tucker ultimately settled in to sympathize with the anarchists convicted of and executed for the Haymarket Square bombing that took place at a labor demonstration on May 4, 1886 which began as a peaceful rally in support of workers striking for an eight-hour day and in reaction to the killing of several workers the previous day by the police.

Private defense forces 
Tucker did not have a utopian vision of anarchy, where individuals would not coerce others. He advocated that liberty and property be defended by private institutions. Opposing the monopoly of the state in providing security, he advocated a free market of competing defense providers, saying that "defense is a service like any other service; [...] it is labor both useful and desired, and therefore an economic commodity, subject to the law of supply and demand".

Tucker said that anarchism "does not exclude prisons, officials, military, or other symbols of force. It merely demands that non-invasive men shall not be made the victims of such force. Anarchism is not the reign of love, but the reign of justice. It does not signify the abolition of force-symbols but the application of force to real invaders". He expressed that the market-based providers of security would offer protection of land that was being used and would not offer assistance to those attempting to collect rent by saying:

Four monopolies 

Tucker argued that the poor condition of American workers resulted from four legal monopolies based in the authoritarianism of the state:
 Money monopoly
 Land monopoly
 Tariffs
 Patents

As described by anarchist Victor Yarros who discussed Tucker's views: "all our multi-millionaires and millionaires, all our predatory capitalists owe their ill-gotten wealth to monopoly and the plunder and ruthless exploitation licensed by monopoly".

For several decades, his focus became the state's economic control of how trade could take place and what currency counted as legitimate. He saw interest and profit as a form of exploitation, made possible by the banking monopoly, in turn maintained through coercion and invasion. Tucker called any such interest and profit usury and saw it as the basis of the oppression of the workers. In his words, "interest is theft, Rent Robbery, and Profit Only Another Name for Plunder".

Tucker believed that usury was immoral, but he upheld the right of all people to engage in immoral contracts: "Liberty, therefore, must defend the right of individuals to make contracts involving usury, rum, marriage, prostitution, and many other things which are believed to be wrong in principle and opposed to human well-being. The right to do wrong involves the essence of all rights". Tucker asserted that anarchism would become meaningless unless "it includes the liberty of the individual to control his product or whatever his product has brought him through exchange in a free market — that is, private property".

Land monopoly 
Tucker opposed granting title to land that was not in use, arguing that an individual should use land continually in order to retain exclusive right to it, believing that if this practice were not followed, there was a land monopoly. He acknowledged that "anything is a product upon which human labor has been expended", but he would not recognize full property rights to labored-upon land: "It should be stated, however, that in the case of land, or of any other material the supply of which is so limited that all cannot hold it in unlimited quantities, Anarchism undertakes to protect no titles except such as are based upon actual occupancy and use".

Money and banking monopoly 
Tucker also opposed state protection of the banking monopoly, i.e. the requirement that one must obtain a charter to engage in the business of banking. He hoped to raise wages by deregulating the banking industry, reasoning that competition in banking would drive down interest rates and stimulate enterprise. Tucker believed this would decrease the proportion of individuals seeking employment and wages would be driven up by competing employers, saying: "Thus the same blow that strikes interest down will send wages up".

While Tucker did not oppose individuals being employed by others, he instead believed that in the present economy individuals do not receive a wage that fully compensates them for their labor due to his interpretation of the labor theory of value. He wrote that if the four monopolies were ended, "it will make no difference whether men work for themselves, or are employed, or employ others. In any case they can get nothing but that wages for their labor which free competition determines". Karl Marx’s acknowledgement  of socialist non-exploitive employers based on the labor theory of value was an influence on Tucker, as can be seen in the following quote by Marx on non-exploitive employers:  “The working day of 12 hours is represented in a monetary value of, for example, 6 shillings. There are two alternatives. Either equivalents are exchanged, and then the worker received 6 shillings for 12 hours of labour; the price of his labour would be equal to the price of his product. In that case he produces no surplus-value for the buyer of his labor, the 6 shillings are not transformed into capital, and the basis of capitalist production vanishes.”  This analysis by Marx helped shape Tucker’s free market socialist views in addition to the influences of Proudhon and Warren. Unlike his support for occupancy and use in regards to living on land, he did not hold the same support for occupancy and use theory for workplaces. Therefore in Tucker’s Individualist Anarchist society, an employer can own several different factories or workplaces in several different areas as long as the employer pays their employees the full value of their labor.

Tariffs and patents 
Tucker opposed protectionism, believing that tariffs caused high prices by preventing national producers from having to compete with foreign competitors. He believed that free trade would help keep prices low and therefore would assist laborers in receiving what he called their "natural wage". Tucker objected to the exploitation of individuals and explained that only under anarchism will man be truly free, saying: "When interest, rent, and profit disappear under the influence of free money, free land, and free trade, it will make no difference whether men work for themselves, or are employed, or employ others. In any case they can get nothing but that wage for their labor which free competition determines".

Furthermore, Tucker did not believe in intellectual property rights in the form of patents on the grounds that patents and copyrights protect something which cannot rightfully be held as property. He wrote that the basis for property is "the fact that it is impossible in the nature of things for concrete objects to be used in different places at the same time". According to Tucker, property in concrete things is "socially necessary". Since "successful society rests on individual initiative, [it is necessary] to protect the individual creator in the use of his concrete creations by forbidding others to use them without his consent". Because ideas are not concrete things, they should not be held and protected as property. Ideas can be used in different places at the same time and so their use should not be restricted by patents. This was a source of conflict with the philosophy of fellow individualist anarchist Lysander Spooner, who saw ideas as the product of "intellectual labor" and therefore private property.

Later embrace of egoism 

Tucker abandoned natural rights positions and converted to Max Stirner's egoist anarchism. Rejecting the idea of moral rights, Tucker said that there were only two rights, "the right of might" and "the right of contract". After converting to egoism, he stated: "In times past, [...] it was my habit to talk glibly of the right of man to land. It was a bad habit, and I long ago sloughed it off. Man's only right to land is his might over it. If his neighbor is mightier than he and takes the land from him, then the land is his neighbor's, until the latter is dispossessed in turn by one mightier still".

In adopting Stirnerite egoism in 1886, Tucker rejected natural rights which had long been considered the foundation of individualist anarchism. This rejection galvanized the movement into fierce debates, with the natural rights proponents accusing the egoists of destroying individualist anarchism itself. So bitter was the conflict that a number of natural rights proponents withdrew from the pages of Liberty in protest even though they had hitherto been among its frequent contributors. Thereafter, Liberty championed egoism, although its general content did not change significantly. This led to a split in American individualist anarchism between the growing number of egoists and the contemporary Spoonerian natural lawyers. Tucker came to hold the position that no rights exist until they are created by contract. This led him to controversial positions such as claiming that infants had no rights and were the property of their parents because they did not have the ability to contract. He said that a person, who physically tries to stop a mother from throwing her "baby into the fire", should be punished for violating her property rights. For example, he said that children would shed their status as property when they became old enough to contract "to buy or sell a house", noting that the precocity varies by age and would be determined by a jury in the case of a complaint.

Tucker also came to believe that aggression towards others was justifiable if doing so led to a greater decrease in "aggregate pain" than refraining from doing so, saying:

Tucker claimed that ownership in land is legitimately transferred through force unless contracted otherwise. However, he said he believed that individuals would come to the realization that equal liberty and occupancy and use doctrines were "generally trustworthy guiding principle of action" and as a result they would likely find it in their interests to contract with each other to refrain from infringing upon equal liberty and from protecting land that was not in use. Although he believed that non-invasion and occupancy and use as the title to land were general rules that people would find in their own interests to create through contract, Tucker said that these rules "must be sometimes trodden underfoot".

Opposition to compulsion 
According to American anarchist Victor Yarros, Tucker was opposed to compulsion. Yarros wrote that Tucker "opposed savagely any and all reform movements that had paternalistic aims, and looked to the state for aid and fulfillment", further stating:

However, Tucker's opposition to socialism was opposition to its state socialism and statist forms of socialism, describing Henry George's single tax as "nothing more than a State socialistic measure, just another crushing tax". In opposing George's single tax, Tucker further explained:

Influence 

Tucker's influences include Mikhail Bakunin, Gustave de Molinari, Pierre-Joseph Proudhon, Herbert Spencer, Lysander Spooner, Max Stirner and Josiah Warren. Tucker has influenced Émile Armand, Kevin Carson, Lev Chernyi, Voltairine de Cleyre, John Henry Mackay, Ricardo Mella, Henry Meulen, Murray Rothbard and Robert Anton Wilson as well as libertarianism as a whole. Along with Spooner and other Liberty writers, Tucker's writings contributed to the development of both left-libertarian and right-libertarian political theory in the United States and were often reprinted in early libertarian journals such as the Rampart Journal and Left and Right: A Journal of Libertarian Thought. This caused a conflict between left-libertarians and right-libertarians, who claimed him as a supporter of capitalism and anarcho-capitalism. For instance, Susan Love Brown claims that Tucker's unpublished private letters in his later life served in "providing the shift further illuminated in the 1970s by anarcho-capitalists", but the editors of the 1970 edition of James J. Martin's book Men Against the State pointed to renewed interest in the views of Tucker and the other individualist anarchists and their free-market socialism rather than capitalism or anarcho-capitalism.

According to the authors of An Anarchist FAQ, Tucker "was against both the state and capitalism, against both oppression and exploitation". While not against the market and property, he was "firmly against capitalism as it was, in his eyes, a state-supported monopoly of social capital" which "allows owners to exploit their employees. [...] This stance puts him squarely in the libertarian socialist tradition and, unsurprisingly, Tucker referred to himself many times as a socialist and considered his philosophy to be 'Anarchistic socialism'". While acknowledging that Tucker "also sometimes railed against 'socialism'", it is argued that "in those cases it is clear that he was referring to state socialism".

In popular culture 
In the alternate history novel The Probability Broach (part of the North American Confederacy series) by L. Neil Smith in which the United States becomes a libertarian state after a successful Whiskey Rebellion and the overthrowing and execution of George Washington by firing squad for treason in 1794, Tucker served as the 17th President of the North American Confederacy from 1892 to 1912.

See also 
 Left-wing market anarchism
 Market Socialism
 Mutualism

References

Further reading

External links 

 Instead of a Book, by a Man Too Busy to Write One (1893, 1897)
 Travelling in Liberty, a complete online archive of Tucker's journal Liberty (1881–1908)
 Several works by Tucker at Anarchy Archives
 State Socialism and Anarchism. How far they agree and wherein they differ (1886)
 Liberty and Taxation from Liberty
 Individual Liberty (1926), a collection of articles
 Benjamin Tucker at Anarchy Archives
 Benjamin Tucker, Liberty, and Individualist Anarchism by Wendy McElroy
 Benjamin Ricketson Tucker from Classical Liberalism
 Benjamin Tucker and His Periodical, Liberty by Carl Watner
 Memories of Benjamin Tucker by J. William Lloyd (1935)
 An Interview With Oriole Tucker by Paul Abrich in which Tucker's daughter reveals biographical information
 Benjamin R Tucker & the Champions of Liberty – A Centenary Anthology, edited by Michael E. Coughlin, Charles H. Hamilton and Mark A. Sullivan
 
 
 
 A Brief Overview of Benjamin Tucker's Individualist Anarchism (2020) by Nicholas Evans

1854 births
1939 deaths
19th-century American male writers
19th-century American non-fiction writers
19th-century atheists
20th-century American male writers
20th-century American non-fiction writers
20th-century atheists
American anarchists
American anti-capitalists
American atheism activists
American libertarians
American male non-fiction writers
American magazine editors
American magazine publishers (people)
American political philosophers
American political writers
American socialists
American tax resisters
Anarchist theorists
Anarchist writers
Egoist anarchists
Free love advocates
Free-market anarchists
Individualist anarchists
Left-libertarians
Libertarian socialists
Massachusetts Institute of Technology alumni
Mutualists
People from Dartmouth, Massachusetts
Philosophy writers
Writers from Massachusetts